Man of Straw (novel), Der Untertan
Man of Straw (film), 1951
Man of Straw (miniseries), 1972 BBC mini-series based on Der Untertan, with Derek Jacobi as Hessling
A Man of Straw (L'uomo di paglia), 1958 film by Pietro Germi
A straw man form of argument

Music
Man of Straw (Viking album), 1989
"Man of Straw" Sad Lovers & Giants 1983

See also
Woman of Straw (1964)